Magomed Ibragimov (born August 18, 1983) is a Russian-Dagestani Uzbek wrestler who competed in the freestyle 96 kg event at the 2004 Summer Olympics and won the silver medal. He was born in Makhachkala, Dagestan.

External links 
 
 
 

1983 births
Living people
Sportspeople from Makhachkala
Olympic wrestlers of Uzbekistan
Wrestlers at the 2004 Summer Olympics
Olympic silver medalists for Uzbekistan
Olympic medalists in wrestling
Asian Games medalists in wrestling
Wrestlers at the 2002 Asian Games
Uzbekistani male sport wrestlers
Medalists at the 2004 Summer Olympics
Medalists at the 2002 Asian Games
Asian Games bronze medalists for Uzbekistan